Idaea aureolaria is a species of moth of the family Geometridae. It is found from Spain and France through central Europe to the Balkan Peninsula and east to Siberia. It is also found from Turkey to Central Asia.

Adults are mainly on wing in June and July, but a second generation with adults on wing from August to September might occur.

The larvae are polyphagous and have been recorded feeding on Rumex, Onobrychis, Securigera varia and Vicia dumetorum. The species overwinters in the larval stage.

References

External links

BioLib
Lepiforum.de
schmetterlinge-deutschlands.de

Moths described in 1775
Sterrhini
Moths of Europe
Moths of Asia
Taxa named by Michael Denis
Taxa named by Ignaz Schiffermüller